Lee is a 2007 Indian Tamil-language drama film directed by Prabhu Solomon and produced by noted actor and Sibiraj's father, Sathyaraj. The film stars Sibiraj, Prakash Raj, Nila, and Vijay Sethupathi in small roles. The film was successful at the box office.

Plot 
Leelatharan, aka Lee, hangs out with a bunch of merry youths who do practically any work and play football in other times. It is a strong-willed and thick-tied group. Chellama, a worker in a facility for the mentally-challenged, is also kind of a groupie. Life is all merry and mirth till she espies Lee & co, attempting an assassination of sorts on a minister. The bid fails, but Chellama is shocked, and so are we. Why would this bunch want to take a crack at the murky world of politics and cricket?

Well, the answer unspools back into a college where Lee and his team are raring to go as footballers and cricketers. They have a committed mentor in Butthiran. Though a coach, he is a friend, philosopher, and guide—a kind of omnibus figure for the youngsters. Just when the boys are making the right progress, a problem erupts in the form of Rangabashyam. He is a scumbag, but also the college principal, and he wants his son to be on this all-conquering team.

The coach, with Chappellesque firmness, says no to this and wants to pick his team on merit, but the principal kicks the team and its coach out of the college itself, so they gravitate towards another college and again start doing well as a team, and when they win a big and prestigious tournament, Rangabashyam throws a major spanner in the works.

He scuttles the rise of Lee and Co., and the stifling is so bad that one member commits suicide, and the team slowly disintegrates. On the other hand, Rangabashyam rises up in the big, bad world of politics. He ends up as a minister. The rest of the movie deals with the conflicts between the two.

Cast 
Sibiraj as Leeladharan (Lee)
Nila as Chellam
Prakash Raj as Buthiran
Sashikumar as Sashi
Zakir Hussain as Rangabashyam
Vidharth as Goon
Pandi
Sabitha Anand 
Vijay Sethupathi as Football Player

Production 
Veteran actor Satyaraj is producing Lee, which stars his son Sibiraj in the lead role. Prabhu Solomon, who had done a racy action scene in Kokki earlier, is directing the film. Sibiraj plays Leeladharan alias Lee, a professional football player. Nila plays the female lead. Prakash Raj plays the football coach in the movie.

Says Sibiraj, "I prepared myself for the role with great difficulty. I ensured that I looked different and changed my mannerism a lot. I grew long hair and beard too."

Since Sibiraj plays football, he underwent football coaching at the YMCA every evening. Director Solomon shot a major portion of Lee on the busy roads of Chennai. The movie was shot on busy roads without the public even being aware of it.

Soundtrack 
The soundtrack was composed by D. Imman.

Critical reception
Sify wrote, "First and foremost the film has nothing to do with football and is another revenge drama. In the end there is a long speech by Lee about how corruption, nepotism have seeped into the game of football in India where cricket rules." Rediff wrote, "Lee may revert to the standard masala elements at points, especially with regard to some stunts (such as Matrix style jumps from one building to the other and flying Maruti Omnis) but it is still different from any other Tamil movie you might have seen off late."

References

External links
 

2007 films
2000s Tamil-language films
Indian association football films
2007 action thriller films
Indian action thriller films
Films scored by D. Imman
Films directed by Prabhu Solomon